Elkton High School is a high school located in Elkton, Maryland, United States on 110 James St. It is a member of the Cecil County Public Schools and there are approximately ~1000 students. Ranked as the 127th school within Maryland by U.S. News, the school is considered to be the 4th-ranked high school within the Cecil County Public School district.

Student demographics 
The student body of Elkton High school is composed of approximately ~1000 students, with 2019 data showing an enrollment of 983 students, slightly less than the historical high of 1067 in 2015. The student body at Elkton High is diverse, seeing a proportional percentage of students from different ethnic groups as well as genders.

The graduation rate of students enrolled at Elkton High School has been consistently above 80% in the past 5 years, as measured by 4-year adjusted cohorts. As of 2019, the graduation rate of students at Elkton High School is 92.9% (223 out of 240 students).

Media coverage 
In 2019, Elkton High school attracted positive media-coverage as Staci Lamb, a 9th-grade English teacher decorated her classroom into a Harry-Potter themed 'castle.' First popularized on social media, the event was covered by both local and international news media. As a winner of the 2018 Cecil County Public Schools Teacher of the Year and finalist for Maryland's Teacher of the Year, Staci Lamb decorated her classroom using her own funds.

Notable alumni
 John O'Donoghue, American professional baseball pitcher
 Bernard Purdie, drummer and an influential R&B, soul and funk musician
 Niles Scott, National Football League player
 Larry Webster, former National Football League player

References

External links
 

Public high schools in Maryland
Schools in Cecil County, Maryland
Elkton, Maryland
Educational institutions established in 1958
1958 establishments in Maryland